Super Monkey Ball: Touch & Roll is a party video game for the Nintendo DS, part of the Super Monkey Ball series. It uses the DS's touch screen as the primary controller for maneuvering the monkey around the level, although D-pad control is also supported.

Gameplay
Super Monkey Ball: Touch & Roll has two different modes: "Party" and "Main". There are six minigames: Race, War, Bowling, Air Hockey, Golf, and Fight. Main has a Challenge Mode in which the player can try to beat the game, or Practice Mode. There are 12 worlds in total, ten of which are available initially and the last two being unlockable.

As in previous Super Monkey Ball games, the object is to roll a monkey from the start of a level to the finish line within an allotted time limit. Along the way, the monkey collects bananas and banana bunches, worth five bananas, for the chance to gain an extra life, after getting ten bananas. Characters include AiAi, MeeMee, Baby and GonGon.

Reception

Super Monkey Ball: Touch & Roll received mixed to average reviews. On Metacritic, the game holds a score of 63/100 based on 40 reviews.

References

2005 video games
3D platform games
Amusement Vision games
Nintendo DS games
Nintendo DS-only games
Sega video games
Touch and Roll
Video games developed in Japan
Multiplayer and single-player video games